Trento Cathedral (Duomo di Trento) is a Roman Catholic cathedral in Trento, northern Italy. It is the mother church of the Roman Catholic Archdiocese of Trento, and until 1802, was the seat of the Prince-Bishopric of Trent. It was built over a pre-existing 4th-century church devoted to Saint Vigilius, patron saint of the city.

History 

Trento Cathedral is the largest church in the city. It is named after Saint Vigilius, who was the first Bishop of Trento and is buried in the cathedral. It was built over the site of the early Christian Basilica of Saint Vigilius, a small church dating to the fourth century. This ancient basilica was built by Vigilius outside the walls to commemorate the martyrdom of the three clerics, Sisinio, Martirio, and Alessandro, by pagans. Upon his death, Vigilius was buried in the church. Prince-Bishop Uldaric II (1022–1055) began the construction of the bishop's palace and a second cathedral. Prince-Bishop Altemanno (1124–1149) completed the construction.

In 1212 Prince-Bishop Federico Wanga razed the previous cathedral to the ground and commissioned the architect Adamo d'Arogno to rebuild the cathedral in the Lombard-Romanesque style. This is the basis of the current structure, and its form has been mostly retained from the 1212 structure.

Construction of the church was interrupted by Wanga's death in the Holy Land, and continued for centuries. Between 1305 and 1307, the gothic south face of the cathedral was built by Egidio de Campione. De Campione's son, Bonino, created the monumental rose window of the cathedral, depicting the Wheel of Fortune, in 1321. The transept also is decorated with 14th-century frescoes depicting the legend of Saint Julian.

Modifications continued into the next centuries, including the addition of a niche containing a statue of the Madonna degli Annegati (Madonna of the Drowned) in the 14th century and the restoration of the monumental romanesque portal by Prince-Bishop Bernardo Clesio in the 15th century.

In 1508, Emperor Maximilian I was crowned in the cathedral.

Between 1545 and 1563 the cathedral hosted the solemn sessions of the Council of Trent.

In 1682, the baroque Chapel of the Crucifix was built in the cathedral by sculptor Giuseppe Alberti around a wood crucifix which was used during the Council of Trent. In 1739 a baroque altar and baldachin based on the work of Bernini was built, leading to the demolition of the preexisting presbytery.

In March 1913, Pope Pius X elevated the cathedral to the rank of minor basilica.

Many of the artworks previously housed in the church are now in the Tridentine Diocesan Museum, a museum housed in the adjacent Bishop's Palace.

Bells 
On the bell tower of the cathedral there is a concert of eight bells in Lab2 which covers the entire octave of the diatonic major scale. Six of these were cast in 1920 by the Luigi Colbacchini foundry of Trento and donated by the city of Mantua, and these are the current first, second, third, fifth, sixth and eighth bells (Lab2-Sib2-Do3-Mib3-Fa3-Lab3).

In 1955, two bells were added, cast by the foundry of Luigi Cavadini in Verona, which were made to insert the fourth and seventh degree missing for the completion of the major diatonic scale.

The ringing of these bells are reserved for solemnities.

On the bell tower of St. Romedius, adjacent to the cathedral, there is a bell dating back to 1862 built by the Chiappani di Trento foundry.

Image gallery

References

External links

Accurate description 

13th-century Roman Catholic church buildings in Italy
Cathedral
Roman Catholic cathedrals in Italy
Romanesque architecture in Italy
Churches in Trentino-Alto Adige/Südtirol